Peter Ficker (born 8 June 1951) is a Brazilian sailor.  He won a bronze medal in the Flying Dutchman Class with Reinaldo Conrad at the 1976 Summer Olympics.

References

 Profile at sports-reference.com

1951 births
Living people
Brazilian male sailors (sport)
Sailors at the 1972 Summer Olympics – Tempest
Sailors at the 1976 Summer Olympics – Flying Dutchman
Olympic sailors of Brazil
Olympic bronze medalists for Brazil
Olympic medalists in sailing
Medalists at the 1976 Summer Olympics